Otto Homlung (born 19 July 1943) is a Norwegian stage producer and theatre director.

He worked as stage instructor at Den Nationale Scene from 1971 to 1973, and later as a freelance instructor for several Norwegian theatres. He was theatre director at Trøndelag Teater from 1984 to 1989, at Det Norske Teatret from 1990 to 1997, and again at Trøndelag Teater from 2005.

Homlung was born in Oslo.

References

1943 births
Living people
Theatre people from Oslo
Norwegian theatre directors
Academic staff of the Oslo National Academy of the Arts